Linger Lane is an album by American jazz vibraphonist Bobby Hutcherson recorded in 1975 and released on the Blue Note label.

Reception 
The Allmusic review awarded the album 2 stars.

Track listing 
All compositions by Bobby Hutcherson except as indicated

 "People Make the World Go Round" (Thom Bell, Linda Creed) - 8:43
 "Theme from M*A*S*H" (Mike Altman, Johnny Mandel) - 4:28
 "Ntu" - 5:47
 "Manzanita" - 4:00
 "Mountain Caravan" (Jerry Peters) - 5:16
 "Silver Rondo" - 2:46

Personnel 
 Bobby Hutcherson - marimba, arranger
 Ernie Watts - reeds
 Jerry Peters - electric piano, arranger
 John Rowin - guitar
 Chuck Rainey - electric bass
 Harvey Mason - drums
 Bobbye Porter Hall - percussion
 Julia Waters - vocals
 Luther Waters - vocals
 Maxine Waters - vocals
 Oren Waters - vocals

References 

Blue Note Records albums
Bobby Hutcherson albums
1975 albums
Albums produced by Jerry Peters